Queen Obisesan (born 15 September 1982) is a Nigerian hammer thrower. She has competed at the African Championships in Athletics, the African Games and the Commonwealth Games.

Early life 
Obisesan was born on 15 September 1982, in Festac Town, Lagos State, Nigeria.

Career 
Obisesan came eighth in the 2010 African Championships in Athletics in the hammer throw. She set a new Nigerian national record in 2013, throwing 63.79 m. In 2014, in the Commonwealth Games in Glasgow she came thirteenth and in the African Championships in Marrakech her position was fourth. She came fifth in both the Commonwealth Games in Australia and the African Championships in 2018. She also beat her 2013 national record, throwing 65.01 m. In 2019, she came fifth in the 2019 African Games in Rabat and won the national competition with a throw of 65.19m.

References  

1982 births
Living people
Nigerian female hammer throwers
Athletes (track and field) at the 2019 African Games
African championships competitors
African Games competitors for Nigeria
Athletes (track and field) at the 2014 Commonwealth Games
Athletes (track and field) at the 2018 Commonwealth Games
Commonwealth Games competitors for Nigeria
21st-century Nigerian women